Florence Picaut (born 25 October 1952 in Paris) is a French athlete (1 m 67, 56 kg), and a specialist in heptathlon, from the club at Stade Français from 1974 (at CS Blanc-Mesnil from 1967 to 1973).

Honours 

 48 selections for France A, from 1969 to 1984 (and 5 for juniors)
 French record holder for heptathlon eight times up to 1981, and twice in 1982 with 5899 pts
 Gold medal in pentathlon at the Mediterranean Games 1979
  French champion in heptathlon seven times, in 1974, and from 1978 to 1983
  French high jump champion 1978
  French long jump champion 1980
  French modern pentathlon champion 1982
 Silver medal in 4 × 400 m relay at the Mediterranean games 1979
  Bronze medallist in pentathlon at European Junior Championships 1970
 Olympic finalist in pentathlon 1980 and 1984

References

 
 

1952 births
French pentathletes
French heptathletes
French female high jumpers
French female long jumpers
Athletes (track and field) at the 1980 Summer Olympics
Athletes (track and field) at the 1984 Summer Olympics
Olympic athletes of France
Athletes (track and field) at the 1979 Mediterranean Games
Mediterranean Games gold medalists for France
Mediterranean Games silver medalists for France
Mediterranean Games medalists in athletics
Athletes from Paris
Living people